Aleksandar Janković (Serbian Cyrillic: Александар Јанковић; born 6 May 1972) is a Serbian football coach and former football player. He is currently head coach of the China national football team.

Playing career
He played football professionally for his hometown club Red Star Belgrade and FK Napredak Kruševac in Serbia, Bonnyrigg White Eagles Football Club (under the name of Sasha Jankovic) in Australia, AS Cherbourg Football and Pau FC in France, and Kansas City Wizards in the United States, before ending his playing career aged 28, due to a knee injury.

Coaching career
While playing at Pau FC, Janković met his compatriot, coach Slavoljub Muslin who would turn out to be an important figure for his eventual venture into coaching. Following the injury that forced him to end his playing career, Janković came into the Red Star organization (club coached by Muslin at the time) in an adviser-scout role during the early 2000. At the end of the 2000–01 season that saw Red Star win another league title (after winning the league and cup double the previous season), Ratko Dostanić, Muslin's assistant, took the head coaching job at FK Obilić, and Muslin offered the vacated place to Janković who thus became Red Star's assistant coach on 5 July 2001 at the age of 29.

However, Janković wouldn't get to stay at his new job for long as very early into the 2001–02 season Muslin abruptly resigned as head coach after the 2001–02 UEFA Champions League qualifying first leg loss to Bayer Leverkusen and Janković left as well.

In March 2002, Muslin resurfaced as head coach at Levski Sofia and Janković followed him there to be his assistant. In April 2003, Muslin got the sack and Janković left again as well.

Couple of months later, during summer 2003 offseason, the duo returned to their old stomping grounds at Red Star. After Zoran Filipović got sacked, Muslin got the head coaching job, and, Janković, by now his established second-in-command, was on his way to Belgrade as well.

From there Janković followed Muslin to Metalurh Donetsk, Lokeren, Lokomotiv Moscow, and back to Lokeren, respectively.

From July 2007, he has been an advance scout in Red Star, and his duties mainly included scouting opponents' players and tactics.

Red Star Belgrade
After Milorad Kosanović's resignation on 9 November 2007, Janković was appointed new head coach of Red Star. Yet, after failing to earn a title in the national championship or in the national cup, he was dismissed on 11 June 2008, to be replaced by Zdeněk Zeman.

Janković has since been appointed head of the Red Star Belgrade Football School.

Lokeren
On 6 April 2009 he was named the new SC Lokeren coach, the Serbian signed until June 2010 and replaces Georges Leekens. On 25 October 2009 Janković was fired after a series of bad results.

China
He was appointed coach of the China Olympic team on 2021, but China did not take any major competition save for the friendly Dubai Cup, where China won one and lost two other matches. He was named the U-23 team coach for the 2022 Asian Games.

He was named interim coach of the China senior team for the 2022 EAFF E-1 Football Championship held in Japan. During the tournament, with most of the squad made up of just under-23 players, China only registered a win and a goal, both against Hong Kong in a 1–0 win by Tan Long's. However, his China did gain an encouraging goalless draw against Japan away, which was the first time in 12 years that China did not lose to Japan in Japanese soil.

On 24 February 2023, He was appointed new head coach of China.

Manager

Personal life
Aleksandar is married and has two children. His father is a notable Serbian sports journalist Dobrivoje "Bobi" Janković. He has been dubbed as "Serbian Mourinho" due to Dejan Andjus criticism about him.

References

External links
 Career Statistics at OzFootball
 Profile at Red Star Belgrade website
 An interview with Aleksandar Janković 

1972 births
Living people
Serbian football managers
Bonnyrigg White Eagles FC players
AS Cherbourg Football players
Expatriate footballers in France
Serbian footballers
Red Star Belgrade footballers
Sporting Kansas City players
Expatriate soccer players in the United States
Expatriate soccer players in Australia
Pau FC players
Serbian expatriate sportspeople in France
Serbian expatriate football managers
K.S.C. Lokeren Oost-Vlaanderen managers
Expatriate football managers in Bulgaria
Expatriate football managers in Belgium
Expatriate football managers in Ukraine
Expatriate football managers in Russia
Expatriate football managers in China
Serbian expatriate sportspeople in Belgium
Serbian expatriate sportspeople in Russia
Serbian expatriate sportspeople in Ukraine
Serbian expatriate sportspeople in Bulgaria
Serbian expatriate sportspeople in China
Red Star Belgrade non-playing staff
Red Star Belgrade managers
Serbia national under-21 football team managers
K.V. Mechelen managers
Standard Liège managers
Association football midfielders